The men's double sculls competition at the 2016 Summer Olympics in Rio de Janeiro was held from 6 to 11 August at the Lagoon Rodrigo de Freitas.

The medals for the competition were presented by Gerhard Heiberg, Norway, member of the International Olympic Committee, and the gifts were presented by Mike Tanner, Hong Kong, member of the executive committee of the International Rowing Federation.

Results

Heats
First three of each heat qualify to the semifinals, remainder goes to the repechage.

Heat 1

Heat 2

Heat 3

Repechage 
The first three of the repechage qualify to the semifinals

Semifinals
First three of each heat qualify to the Final A, remainder goes to the Final B.

Semifinal 1

Semifinal 2

Finals

Final B

Final A

References

Men's double sculls
Men's events at the 2016 Summer Olympics